Yugoslavia was present at the Eurovision Song Contest 1964, held in Copenhagen, Denmark.

Before Eurovision

Jugovizija 1964 
The Yugoslav national final to select their entry, was held on 5 February at the Delavski Dom in Trbovlje, hosted by Helena Koder. There were 8 songs in the final, each from the four subnational public broadcasters: RTV Ljubljana, RTV Zagreb, RTV Belgrade, and RTV Sarajevo. The winner was chosen by the votes of an eight-member jury of experts, one juror for each of the six republics and the two autonomous provinces. At the end of the contest, there was a tie between Sabahudin Kurt's song "Život je sklopio krug" and Marjana Deržaj's "Zlati April". Since the Bosnian singer Sabahudin Kurt and his song received more top marks than Marjana Deržaj's, it was chosen as the winner. "Život je sklopio krug" was written by Srđan Matijević and Stevan Raičković.

At Eurovision
Sabahudin Kurt performed 13th on the night of the Contest following Italy and preceding Switzerland. At the close of the voting the song had received 0 points (nul points), sharing 13th (last) place in the field of 16 competing countries.

Voting 
Yugoslavia did not receive any points at the 1964 Eurovision Song Contest.

Notes

References

External links
Eurodalmatia official ESC club
Eurovision Song Contest National Finals´ Homepage
Eurovision France
ECSSerbia.com

1964
Countries in the Eurovision Song Contest 1964
Eurovision